Swinton Academy  is a mixed Academy and sixth form located in Swinton, South Yorkshire, England.

q

Ofsted inspections
In November 2011, in the last inspection by Ofsted of the pre-academy school, it was judged to be a "Good" school with a good sixth form. In 2019, three years after the conversion to an Academy, Ofsted's first inspection of the academy found it to "Require Improvement".

Since the commencement of Ofsted inspections in September 1993, Swinton has undergone five inspections:

Head teachers
 Mr Dave Shevill, September 1997–August 2009
 Mr David Pridding, September 2009–August 2014
 Mr John Morrison, September 2014–August 2016
 Mrs Rebecca Hibberd, September 2016 – present. Very proud and privileged.

Principals
 Mr John Morrison & Mrs Rebecca Hibberd, September 2016–August 2017
 Mrs Rebecca Hibberd, September 2017 – present

References

External links
Swinton Academy official website

Academies in Rotherham
Secondary schools in Rotherham
Swinton, South Yorkshire